The Oswaldo Cruz Foundation (Portuguese Fundação Oswaldo Cruz, also known as FIOCRUZ) is a scientific institution for research and development in biological sciences located in Rio de Janeiro, Brazil; it is considered one of the world's main public health research institutions. It was founded by Dr. Oswaldo Cruz, a noted physician and epidemiologist.

The organization started in 1898 as the Federal SeroTherapy Institute with the objective of developing serum and vaccines against the bubonic plague. It was located outside Rio de Janeiro. The institute's activities, however, changed from simple production into research and experimental medicine, especially after Oswaldo Cruz assumed its leadership in 1902. From there on, the institute became the base for memorable sanitation campaigns in an age of outbreaks and epidemics of the bubonic plague, yellow fever, and smallpox. 
The institute, however, was not confined to Rio de Janeiro and collaborated in the occupation of the country's interior through scientific expeditions, aiding in the development of the country.

When Oswaldo Cruz died in 1917, the institute, which by then already bore his name, was nationally consolidated and important scientific achievements followed, such as Carlos Chagas’ description of the complete cycle of the American trypanosomiasis including the clinical pattern of the disease.

Today the institution has a broad range of responsibilities related to the health and wellbeing of the Brazilian population, functioning as a national institute of health for the Brazilian government. These responsibilities include 
hospital and ambulatory care, 
health-related research, 
development of vaccines, drugs, reagents, and diagnostic kits 
research, development and production, 
training of public health and health workers, 
providing information and communications related to health, science, and technology.

The Fiocruz workforce members number over 7,500. Fiocruz includes several fixed facilities in Rio de Janeiro and other locations; however, it contributes to improving health throughout the country, through its support to the Sistema Único de Saúde (Unified Health System, the Brazilian public health system), its proposals on public health policy-making, its research activities, its scientific expeditions, and the reach of its health services and products.

Fiocruz is one of the founding members of the International Association of National Public Health Institutes, a membership organization of national public health institutes.  The foundation has a longstanding collaboration with GISAID, analyzing and curating COVID-19 virus data in the Americas, then quickly contributing those genetic sequences to the repository.

See also
Fiocruz Genome Comparison Project
Museum of Life
Memórias do Instituto Oswaldo Cruz, its official medical journal

References

External links
 

Medical and health organisations based in Brazil
Medical research institutes
Public health organizations
Organisations based in Rio de Janeiro (city)
Research institutes in Brazil